was a small theatre in Shibuya in Tokyo which was open from 1969 to 2000. It was the site of regular performances by Takahashi Chikuzan until his death, regular performances by Nobuo Nakamura of The Lesson, and live appearances by Noriko Awaya and Akihiro Miwa.

References

External links
A site collecting monthly programmes

Former theatres in Japan
Buildings and structures in Shibuya
Theatres in Tokyo
Theatres completed in 1969
1969 establishments in Japan
2000 disestablishments in Japan